Stanisław Ustupski (born 15 November 1966 in Zakopane) was a Polish nordic combined skier who competed from 1989 to 1994. He finished eighth in the 15 km individual event at the 1992 Winter Olympics in Albertville. At the 1994 Winter Olympics in Lillehammer he was 21.

Ustupski's only career victory was in a 15 km individual World Cup B event in Poland in 1992.

External links
 

1966 births
Nordic combined skiers at the 1992 Winter Olympics
Nordic combined skiers at the 1994 Winter Olympics
Living people
Polish male Nordic combined skiers
Olympic Nordic combined skiers of Poland
Sportspeople from Zakopane
Universiade medalists in nordic combined
Universiade silver medalists for Poland
Competitors at the 1993 Winter Universiade
20th-century Polish people